Siloxerus humifusus is a species of plant in the tribe Gnaphalieae within the family Asteraceae native to Western Australia. It was first described in 1806 by Jacques Labillardière.

It is an annual herb, growing to heights of 1 cm to 15 cm on sandy soils in moist places. Its white to cream flowers may be seen from September to January.

References

External links
Siloxerus humifusus Photo gallery at iNaturalist
Siloxerus humifusus occurrence data from GBIF

Gnaphalieae
Endemic flora of Australia
Taxa named by Jacques Labillardière